Ellie Renee Johnston (born 29 January 2003) is an Australian cricketer who plays for Queensland Fire in the Women's National Cricket League (WNCL) and Brisbane Heat in the Women's Big Bash League (WBBL). An all-rounder, she is a right-handed batter and right-arm leg break bowler. She made her professional debut in a WNCL match for Queensland against South Australia on 20 February 2021. She is the cousin of her Queensland teammate Ruth Johnston.

References

External links

Australian women cricketers
Living people
Queensland Fire cricketers
Place of birth missing (living people)
2003 births